Frank Giddens (January 20, 1959 – July 15, 2004) was an American football tackle. He played for the Philadelphia Eagles from 1981 to 1982.

References

1959 births
2004 deaths
American football tackles
New Mexico Lobos football players
Philadelphia Eagles players
Arizona Wranglers players